Santa Clara d'Oeste is a municipality in the state of São Paulo in Brazil. The population is 2,113 (2020 est.) in an area of 183 km². The elevation is 401 m.

References

Municipalities in São Paulo (state)